Eula may refer to:
 End-user license agreement, a type of software license agreement
 Eula (river), a right tributary of the Wyhra in Saxony, Germany
 Eula, Berga, a village in the borough of Berga/Elster, Greiz district, Thuringia, Germany
 Eula, Borna, a village in the borough of Borna, Leipzig district, Saxony, Germany
 Eula, Nossen, a village in the borough of Nossen, Meißen district, Saxony, Germany
 Eula, Texas, a community in the United States
 , known as Eula in German, a tributary of the Elbe in Jílové, Czech Republic
 Eulatal, a former municipality in the Leipzig district, Saxony, Germany.
 Eula (given name), a feminine given name
 Joe Eula (1925–2004), American fashion illustrator 
  Eula, a character in the game Genshin Impact.